Francesco Cattani da Diacceto (2 September 1531 – 4 November 1595), often referred to as Francesco Cattani da Diacceto il Giovane in order to distinguish him from his grandfather, the philosopher Francesco di Zanobi Cattani da Diacceto (1466–1522), was Bishop of Fiesole and author of several works including an Essamerone ("Hexameron") and a translation into vernacular Florentine Italian of the Hexaëmeron and De Officiis Clericorum of Saint Ambrose.

Life 

Cattani di Diacceto was born on 2 September 1531 to Dionigi Cattani di Diacceto and Maria di Guglielmo Martini. His father was one of the thirteen children of the noted philosopher Francesco di Zanobi Cattani da Diacceto, sometimes dubbed "Il Vecchio" or "Il Pagonazzo" to distinguish him from his grandson.

In 1546 Cattani became a canon of the Cathedral of Florence, and by 1558 was an apostolic pronotary. On 11 August 1570 he was named Bishop of Fiesole, on the retirement of his uncle Angelo Cattani da Diacceto from that post.

He had studied civil law and theology, and as a young man had been associated with the Accademia fiorentina of Marsilio Ficino. He was a prolific writer on religious topics. He attempted to collect and publish the works, in Latin and Italian, of his grandfather Francesco di Zanobi Cattani da Diacceto, and commissioned Benedetto Varchi to write his biography. This was published together with the Tre libri d’amore e un panegirico all’amore of the elder Cattani in Venice in 1561.

He died on 4 November 1595; he was buried in the Oratory of San Jacopo in the Bishop's Palace of Fiesole.

Works 

His published works include:
 Gli uffici di S. Ambruogio vescouo di Milano: in volgar fiorentino. Fiorenza: Lorenzo Torrentino, 1558.
 Homelie del reverendo m. Francesco Cattani da Diacetto Sopra la sequenza del corpo di Christo. Fiorenza,: appresso L. Torrentino, 1559.
 L'Essamerone di S. Ambruogio tradotto in volgar Fiorentino per M. Francesco Cattani da Diacceto. Fiorenza: Lorenzo Torrentino, 1560.
 Discorso dell'autorità del Papa sopra 'l Concilio. Fiorenza: appresso i Giunti, 1562.
 Instituzione spirituale de Messer Lodovico Blosio: Utilissima a coloro, che aspirano alla perfezzione della vita. Fiorenza: Giunti, 1562.
 L'Essamerone del Reverendo M. Franceso Cattani da Diacceto. In Fiorenza: appresso Lorenzo Torrentino, 1563.
 Discorso del reuerendo m. Francesco de Cattani da Diacceto ... sopra la superstizzione dell'arte magica. In Fiorenza: appresso Valente Panizzi & Marco Peri, circa 1567.
 La vita dell'immaculata et gloriosissima sempre vergine santa Maria madre di Dio et signor nostro Giesu Christo. In Firenze: Nella Stamperia di Bartolomeo Sermartelli, 1584.

References

Further reading 

 R. Tucci, "Ricerche su Francesco Cattani da Diacceto il Giovane (1531-1595): Cultura teologica e problemi formativi e pastorali" (Thesis, in Italian). Florence: Università degli Studi di Firenze, Facoltà di Lettere e Filosofia, Anno Accademico 1979–80.

Bishops in Tuscany
1531 births
1595 deaths
Writers from Florence
Italian male writers
16th-century Italian writers
16th-century Italian Roman Catholic bishops
Clergy from Florence